Théodolinde of Leuchtenberg (13 April 1814 – 1 April 1857), Countess of Württemberg by marriage, was a Franco-German princess. She was a granddaughter of Joséphine de Beauharnais, Napoleon's first wife.

Biography 
The fifth of the seven children of Eugène de Beauharnais (1781–1824), Duke of Leuchtenberg, and his wife, Princess Augusta of Bavaria (1788–1851), Théodolinde was born in Mantua, Italy, and presumably named for Theudelinda, a 6th-century queen of the Lombards. She had two brothers (Auguste and Maximilian) and three surviving sisters (Joséphine, Eugénie, and Amélie). Joséphine de Beauharnais, the first wife of Napoléon Bonaparte and former Empress of France, was her paternal grandmother. The latter, however, died about six weeks after Théodolinde's birth.

Through her marriage to Friedrich Wilhelm Alexander Ferdinand, Count of Württemberg, Théodolinde became Countess (Gräfin) of Württemberg, but died before her husband was created Duke of Urach. She died after a short illness on the morning of 1 April 1857 in Stuttgart, Germany, and was buried in the family vault at Ludwigsburg Palace, with her heart buried at the Hauskapelle of the palace in Munich.

She was the subject of an 1836 portrait by Friedrich Dürck.

Marriage and issue
On 8 February 1841, at the age of 26, she was married in Munich to Wilhelm, Count of Württemberg (afterwards Duke of Urach), whose father, Wilhelm Friedrich of Württemberg, was a younger brother of Friedrich II, the last Duke of Würtemberg, whom Napoleon later (1806) elevated to the status of King of Württemberg, as Friedrich I. He was also a cousin of Princess Catharina of Württemberg (1783–1835), who became the second wife of Jérôme Bonaparte, Napoleon's youngest brother, in 1807.

Four daughters were born from this marriage:
 Princess Augusta Eugenie of Urach (1842–1916)
 Married first Count Rudolf von Enzenberg zum Freyen und Jochelsthurn (1835–1874) and second Count Franz von Thun und Hohenstein (1826–1888). Both of her marriages produced issue. 
 Princess Marie Josephine of Urach (1844–1864).
 Princess Eugenia Amalie of Urach (1848–1867).
 Princess Mathilde of Urach (1854–1907)
 Married Paolo Altieri, Prince of Oriolo and Viano (1849–1901), by whom she had issue.

Her husband's second marriage to Princess Florestine of Monaco produced his heir, the future Wilhelm Karl, Duke of Urach.

Ancestry

Notes

 Théodelinde de Beauharnais at thePeerage.com
 Arnold McNaughton: The Book of Kings: A Royal Genealogy, London (1973)

1814 births
1857 deaths
19th-century German women
Countesses of Württemberg
Duchesses of Leuchtenberg
French princesses
German princesses
Beauharnais
Nobility of Mantua
Burials at St. Michael's Church, Munich
Princesses by marriage